Wembley North was a parliamentary constituency in what was then the Borough of Wembley in North-West London.  It returned one Member of Parliament (MP) to the House of Commons of the Parliament of the United Kingdom, elected by the first-past-the-post voting system.

History

The constituency was created at the 1945 general election, and abolished at the February 1974 general election.

Boundaries
The Municipal Borough of Wembley wards of Chalkhill, Fryent, Kenton, Preston, Roe Green, and The Hyde.

Members of Parliament

Elections

Elections in the 1940s

Elections in the 1950s

Elections in the 1960s

Elections in the 1970s

References

Parliamentary constituencies in London (historic)
Constituencies of the Parliament of the United Kingdom established in 1945
Constituencies of the Parliament of the United Kingdom disestablished in 1974
Politics of the London Borough of Brent